Ashkan Kooshanejad (Persian: اشکان کوشانژاد; born 13 August 1985), also known as Ash Koosha, is a British-Iranian technology entrepreneur, multidisciplinary artist, futurist and innovator. He is known to use computer software such as artificial intelligence and virtual reality in his work. He is the CEO and co-founder of Oorbit Inc. and one of the founders of Auxuman Inc. He played the lead role in an Iranian-Cannes jury prize winner docufiction film by director Bahman Ghobadi called No One Knows About Persian Cats, which follows his band's story scouring the Iranian underground music scene trying to find musicians to play in a festival in the UK.

Kooshanejad sought asylum in the UK as a result of the reaction to the film in Iran.

Kooshanejad released the album GUUD in 2015. The video for "I Feel That" was directed by digital artist Hirad Sab. The album has received positive feedback and support from music critics such as Pitchfork. The album holds a rating of 4.4/5 on Discogs.

He released his second album I AKA I on London label Ninja Tune which has gained critical acclaim worldwide. The album holds a rating of 4/5 on AllMusic and 79 on Metacritic
I AKA I was accompanied by CGI videos created by Hirad Sab and was premiered on Adult Swim.

In 2015, he introduced the concept for the world's first virtual reality album and has developed multi sensory experiences for songs such as Snow, OTE, Stained and Eluded since.
He has performed using a virtual reality headset for the first time at the London Institute of Contemporary Art, in collaboration with TheWaveVR.

In 2018, he introduced a virtual singer named "YONA" using advanced technologies

In 2019, he founded Auxuman inc., a technology company building virtual musicians using artificial intelligence.

In 2021, he founded Oorbit inc., a cloud computing company that makes infrastructure for the metaverse.

Early life and education
Kooshanejad was born and raised in Tehran, Iran. He studied music at Tehran Conservatory of Music.

Discography

Albums

Singles

Filmography

References

Iranian singer-songwriters
Living people
People from Tehran
Year of birth missing (living people)
Musicians from London